The AFC second round of 2002 FIFA World Cup qualification was contested between the 10 group winners from the First round split across 2 groups.

The top country in each group at the end of the stage progressed to the 2002 FIFA World Cup, with the two runners up facing each other in a play off. The winner of this play off went on to compete for a place in the World Cup in the UEFA / AFC Intercontinental Play-off.

Group A

Note: This match was originally scheduled for 13 October 2001 and started normally, but was interrupted at 25 minutes when Bahrain won 1–0 due to an electrical fire at Rajamangala Stadium.

Group B

References

External links
 FIFA.com Reports
 RSSSF Page

2002 FIFA World Cup qualification (AFC)
Qual